The WKW Tor or Wilk (Wolf) is a modern anti-materiel and/or sniper rifle produced in Poland by the Zakłady Mechaniczne Tarnów factory. The nickname "WKW Tor" stands for Wielkokalibrowy Karabin Wyborowy or Large Caliber Sniper Rifle. Its military designation in the Polish army is known as the Tor. This rifle was developed between 2000 and 2004 and the first selected units in the Polish army apparently received Wilk/Tor rifles in around 2005 onwards.

The WKW Wilk/Tor anti-materiel and/or sniper rifle makes use of a manually operated rotary bolt action weapon of bull-pup layout. It is fed from detachable box magazines and is fitted with a folding and adjustable bipod and an adjustable rear monopod. Standard sighting equipment is a Schmidt & Bender X3−12 P/MII telescope sight which is placed on Picatinny rails above the receiver.

Gallery

Users
: Ca. 80 examples bought.
: Ca. 15 examples bought.
: Unknown amount donated by Poland.
: Ca. 50 examples bought.

See also
List of bullpup firearms
List of sniper rifles
AMP Technical Services DSR-50
Barrett M95
Gepard
KSVK

References

.50 BMG sniper rifles
Bolt-action rifles of Poland
Bullpup rifles
Sniper rifles of Poland
Anti-materiel rifles
Military equipment introduced in the 2000s